This is a list of hospitals for each country in Africa.

Sovereign states
In 2018, Nigeria had the largest number of hospitals in sub-Saharan Africa, with 879. Other countries in this region with large numbers of hospitals include Democratic Republic of Congo (435), Kenya (399) and South Africa (337).

The following list shows links to Lists of healthcare and hospital articles where they exist in Wikipedia and categories for hospitals in sovereign states in Africa. The numbers in parentheses are the numbers of current articles in the category for hospitals in each state.

States with limited recognition
Sahrawi Arab Democratic Republic List
Republic of Somaliland List

Dependencies and other territories

Canary Islands List (Category ) (Spain)
Ceuta List (Autonomous City of Spain)
Melilla List (autonomous region of Spain)
Madeira List (autonomous region of Portugal)
Mayotte List (France)
Réunion List (France)
Saint Helena hospital List (United Kingdom), one small 54-bed hospital
Ascension Island List (United Kingdom)
Tristan da Cunha List (United Kingdom), no hospitals, only one doctor
Western Sahara (disputed territory, partially controlled by Sahrawi Arab Democratic Republic)
Hospital de Navarra, Tifariti
Hospital Moulay Hassane Ben Mehdi, Laayoune 
4eme Military Hospital, Dakhla
Zanzibar (Autonomous Region of Tanzania), List 145 medical facilities

See also
Lists of hospitals in Asia
Lists of hospitals in Europe
Lists of hospitals in North America
Lists of hospitals in Oceania
Lists of hospitals in South America

References

External links

 
Hospitals
 Lists of hospitals in Africa
Hospitals in Africa